Middletown School District can refer to the following public school districts in the United States:

 Enlarged City School District of Middletown in Middletown, New York
 Middletown Area School District in Middletown, Pennsylvania
 Middletown City School District in Middletown, Ohio
 Middletown Township Public School District in Middletown Township, New Jersey
 Middletown Unified School District in Lake County, California
 Middletown Public Schools (Rhode Island)

See also
 Middleton School District, Idaho
 Appoquinimink School District, which serves Middletown, Delaware